Dylan Cabral Sacramento (born March 4, 1995) is a Canadian soccer player who plays as a midfielder.

Club career

Toronto FC
Sacramento originally played with TFC Academy II in 2012 in the Second Division of the Canadian Soccer League. He later played with Toronto FC Senior Academy in the inaugural season of League1 Ontario. He notably scored the first goal in the league's history.

K–W United
Sacramento joined PDL club K–W United FC for the 2015 season. The club would capture the PDL Championship that year.

Vaughan Azzurri
Sacramento returned to League1 Ontario for the 2018 season, signing with the Vaughan Azzurri. He finished the season with 10 goals in 11 games and 4 goals in 4 playoff games, including the game-winner in the final to help Vaughan capture the League1 Championship. At the end of the season Sacramento would be named League1 MVP.

Valour FC
In December 2018, Sacramento signed with Valour FC of the Canadian Premier League. He made his debut against Pacific FC on May 1, 2019. On September 15, 2019 he scored his first professional goal in a 4–2 win over York9. On October 7, 2019 Sacramento was granted an early leave from the club to pursue an opportunity in New Zealand.

Hawke's Bay United
On October 31, 2019 Sacramento went on loan with New Zealand Football Championship side Hawke's Bay United. In his short stint with the club, he had four assists in eight games.

Galway United
Sacramento signed with Irish club Galway United on January 26, 2020. He made his debut in a 2020 League of Ireland Cup match against Athlone Town. He departed the club in July, just prior to the re-starting of the league following the postponement due to the COVID-19 pandemic.

References

External links

1995 births
Living people
Association football midfielders
Canadian soccer players
Soccer players from Winnipeg
Canadian people of Portuguese descent
Canadian expatriate soccer players
Expatriate soccer players in the United States
Canadian expatriate sportspeople in the United States
Expatriate association footballers in New Zealand
Canadian expatriate sportspeople in New Zealand
Expatriate association footballers in the Republic of Ireland
Canadian expatriate sportspeople in Ireland
York Lions soccer players
Toronto FC players
K-W United FC players
Florida Gulf Coast Eagles men's soccer players
Valour FC players
Hawke's Bay United FC players
Galway United F.C. players
Canadian Soccer League (1998–present) players
League1 Ontario players
USL League Two players
Canadian Premier League players
New Zealand Football Championship players
League of Ireland players
Canada men's youth international soccer players
Vaughan Azzurri players